Lawrence Hill (born September 4, 1971) better known by his stage name Larry Larr is an American rapper and businessman. He first came in the music wave with other Philadelphia rappers such as Schooly D, Steady B and DJ Jazzy Jeff & The Fresh Prince in the mid eighties. He first signed his deal with Ruffhouse Records and released his debut album entitled "Da Wizzard Of Odds" in 1991 with the lead single "Larry, What They Called Me" which only charted on the Hot Rap Songs at the position 7 and his second single "Confused" only made it at 10 on the Hot Rap Songs as well. However the album didn't sell well only making 67 on Top R&B/Hip-Hop Albums chart.

Studio albums

References 

1971 births
African-American male rappers
Living people
Businesspeople from Philadelphia
Rappers from Philadelphia
Ruffhouse Records artists
Columbia Records artists
East Coast hip hop musicians
Gangsta rappers
21st-century American rappers
21st-century American male musicians
21st-century African-American musicians
20th-century African-American people